Several manga series have been developed based on the Neon Genesis Evangelion anime series created by Gainax. While the first manga is a direct adaptation of the anime series, the following ones are spin-off series with several differences.

The first manga from the series is entitled simply Neon Genesis Evangelion, written and illustrated by Yoshiyuki Sadamoto, who also worked in the character designs from the anime. The manga closely follows the anime story with few changes made to the characters or certain events. The series was serialized in Shōnen Ace from Kadokawa Shoten starting in 1995, but it was put on hiatus until July 2009 when it resumed in the first issue of Kadokawa's Young Ace. The series finally concluded with its 95th chapter in June 2013.

Additionally, Fumino Hayashi authored the spin-off series called Neon Genesis Evangelion: Angelic Days, which focuses on the romantic relationships between the main characters. Kadokawa Shoten serialized the series in Monthly Asuka and collected the series into six tankōbon volumes. The volumes were published from February 17, 2004 to December 17, 2005. In the United States, Newtype USA serialized the series, while ADV Manga released the six volumes. Another series having a similar focus is Neon Genesis Evangelion: Shinji Ikari Raising Project, authored by Osamu Takahashi. Shōnen Ace had published the chapters from June 2005 to February 2016, with 18 tankōbon having been released. Dark Horse Comics has licensed the series for English release, while the first volume was released on July 8, 2009.

Min Min has also authored Neon Genesis Evangelion: Campus Apocalypse, which uses the same setting from the manga series, but a big difference from the Evangelions and the main characters. It was published in Monthly Asuka from October 2007 to December 2009, and it has been collected into four tankōbon volumes.

Another manga named Neon Genesis Evangelion: The Shinji Ikari Detective Diary started serialization in Asukas February 24, 2010 issue and is authored by Takumi Yoshimura in collaboration with Gainax and Khara. As the title indicates, this series re-envisions Shinji as a detective. Volume one was released by Dark Horse Comics in September 2013.

A light novel series Neon Genesis Evangelion: ANIMA was serialized from January 2008 to April 2013 in Dengeki Hobby Magazine from ASCII Media Works. The series is set in an alternate future diverging from the events of the anime. The novel begins 3 years after the end of the Human Instrumentality Project, replacing episodes 25 and 26 of the anime, as well as the End of Evangelion film. Seven Seas Entertainment published the light novel series Neon Genesis Evangelion: ANIMA for the first time in North America in print and on digital platforms in single volume editions. Volume 1 was released on October 29, 2019.

Volumes

Neon Genesis Evangelion

Neon Genesis Evangelion: Angelic Days

Neon Genesis Evangelion: Shinji Ikari Raising Project

It's A Miraculous Win 
 is a manga series based on the CR Evangelion pachinko machines. It is set in a world where Evangelion is a fictional franchise, and the main character is an office lady, aged 24, called Sakura Mogam who loves to play Evangelion themed pachinko. She is a lively but clumsy young woman, obsessed with everything Evangelion-related, and owns multiple Evangelion merchandise. It is a light comedy manga that follows Sakura's misadventures and daily suffering as an obsessed Evangelion fan, as she frequently reminisces over scenes from the anime series, and even relives some of them in daily life. She also works with several people that happen to look exactly like some Evangelion cast members like Ritsuko and her boss looks like Fuyutsuki. Mogami herself cosplays Rei and Asuka, and has a design similar to Gunbuster'''s Noriko. Notably, Mogami dates a pachinko parlor employee who looks exactly like Kaworu.

Neon Genesis Evangelion: Campus Apocalypse

Neon Genesis Evangelion: ANIMA

Petit Eva 

Petit Eva: Evangelion@School

Petit Eva Bokura Tanken Dōkōkai

Neon Genesis Evangelion: The Shinji Ikari Detective Diary

Neon Genesis Evangelion: Comic Tribute 

Tony Takezaki's Neon Genesis Evangelion 
A parodic spin-off published by Dark Horse Comics. (Some parts of this book are included in Neon Genesis Evangelion: Comic Tribute.)

Neon Genesis Evangelion: Legend of the Piko-Piko Middle School Students

 Evangelion 3.0 (-120 min.) 
Included with the updated release of the final film of the Rebuild of Evangelion tetralogy, Evangelion: 3.0+1.01 Thrice Upon a Time, released in Japanese theaters on June 12, 2021. It is a prequel manga set before the events of the previous film, Evangelion: 3.0 You Can (Not) Redo, written by director Kazuya Tsurumaki under Anno's supervision. It is 17 pages long, part of a 36 page booklet called Eva Extra-Extra'' including other illustrations. The manga was Anno's initiative, and began production on April 11, 2021.

Notes

References

External links
List of Neon Genesis Evangelion manga published in US

 
Neon Genesis Evangelion
Chapters